Overall is an unincorporated community in Rutherford County, Tennessee.

History
A post office called Overall was established in 1880, and remained in operation until 1953. The community has the name of John C. Overall, a pioneer citizen.

References

Unincorporated communities in Rutherford County, Tennessee
Unincorporated communities in Tennessee